Fraser Anderson Fyvie (born 27 March 1993) is a Scottish professional footballer who plays as a midfielder for Scottish Championship side Cove Rangers. He previously played for Aberdeen, Wigan Athletic, Hibernian, and Dundee United, and has represented Scotland at the under-15, under-17, under-19, and under-21 levels. Fyvie is part of a rare group of players to lift both the Scottish Cup and FA Cup.

Early life
Fraser Fyvie was born in Aberdeen on 27 March 1993, and was educated at Hazlehead Academy.

Club career

Aberdeen
Fyvie became the youngest ever player to play for Aberdeen, when he made his debut against Hamilton Academical at the age of 16 in August 2009, and won the Man of the Match award for the game. Fyvie scored his first senior goal for Aberdeen on 27 January 2010, against Hearts at Tynecastle. This goal made him the youngest ever goalscorer in a Scottish Premier League match, breaking the record previously held by Dundee United player David Goodwillie. The next day Fyvie signed a new three-year deal with Aberdeen.

In August 2010, he was ruled out for the rest of the 2010–11 season with a cruciate ligament injury sustained in a League Cup tie against Alloa Athletic. He returned to the first team in a 2–0 defeat against St Johnstone in May 2011.

Having recovered fully from his injury sustained in the previous season, Fyvie began to establish himself in the Aberdeen first team, regularly featuring in the starting eleven. He scored his first league goal of the 2011–12 season against Dunfermline Athletic in an SPL trial game of Friday night football. He also received the first red card of his career for foul and abusive language towards a linesman, in a 2–2 draw against St Mirren. Fyvie scored his second goal of the season in a Scottish Cup fifth round replay victory, away to Queen of the South.

The midfielder refused a contract extension towards the end of the 2011–2012 season, wanting to pursue his career down in England. With his contract due to expire midway through the 2012–13 season, manager Craig Brown was keen to sell Fyvie, with Premier League clubs Fulham and Wigan Athletic interested.

Wigan Athletic
Fyvie signed for Wigan Athletic in July 2012, with the Latics paying Aberdeen an undisclosed transfer fee believed to be around £500,000. Wigan manager Roberto Martínez praised him for the impact he had already made during his career at Aberdeen. The midfielder agreed a three-year contract with Wigan. On 28 August 2012, he made his debut as a substitute in the League Cup against Nottingham Forest which Wigan won 4–1. Fyvie was also brought on in the following League Cup match at West Ham on 25 September which again ended 4–1 in Wigan's favour. On 30 October, he made his full debut in Wigan's starting line-up, again in the League Cup, in a surprise defeat to Bradford following a penalty shoot-out. In November and December 2012, Fyvie was part of Wigan's Premier League match day squad seven times but did not feature. In January 2013, Fyvie started in Wigan's third round FA Cup matches against Bournemouth. He was an unused substitute as Wigan won the 2013 FA Cup Final.

On 17 October 2013, Fyvie joined fellow Championship side Yeovil Town on a loan deal, originally scheduled to end on 1 January 2014. Fyvie made his debut for Yeovil in their 0–0 draw against Brighton & Hove Albion, on 19 October 2013, but was forced off after 22 minutes having suffering a shoulder injury. He made just one further appearance for Yeovil before making an early return to Wigan on 16 December 2013.

On 23 January 2014, Fyvie joined Shrewsbury Town on a one-month loan deal. He was released from his contract with Wigan on 2 February 2015.

Hibernian
After being released by Wigan, Fyvie signed a short-term contract with Hibernian (Hibs). He made 17 appearances for Hibs during the remainder of the 2014–15 season. At the end of the season, Fyvie signed a two-year contract with Hibs. Fyvie was suspended for two matches by the Scottish FA for simulation during a match against Rangers in December 2015. The SFA found that Fyvie had feigned an injury to his face by Rangers midfielder Andy Halliday, who had aimed a kick and then barged Fyvie with his shoulder, which resulted in Halliday being sent off. Fyvie helped Hibernian win the 2015–16 Scottish Cup, in which they defeated Rangers 3–2 in the cup final.

Fyvie helped Hibs to gain promotion by winning the 2016–17 Scottish Championship. He was one of several players to be offered a new contract at the end of the season, but the offer was withdrawn after he took too long to respond.

Dundee United
Fyvie signed a one-year contract with Scottish Championship club Dundee United on 4 August 2017. He suffered a cruciate ligament injury in December 2017, which was expected to prevent him from playing for the rest of the 2017/18 season. Despite not playing again following his injury, it was announced on 17 May 2018 that he had signed a new two-year contract to stay at the club. United manager Csaba Laszlo indicated that he considered Fyvie to be "an important player" for the club and described his signing a new contract as "excellent news as we build our squad ahead of the 2018/19 season." Fyvie was released by United on 6 May 2019.

Cove Rangers
Fyvie signed a short-term contract with the newly promoted Scottish League Two side, Cove Rangers, in August 2019.

International career
Fyvie has played for Scotland at under-15, under-16, under-17, and under-19 levels. He made his first appearance for the under-21 team in October 2012.

Style of play
Roberto Martínez, after signing Fyvie for Wigan Athletic, said "Technically he's very gifted, enjoys playing in the midfield where he can cover large areas, he's very powerful off the ball and in possession is someone who can read the tempo of the game very well".

Career statistics

Honours

Club 
Wigan Athletic
FA Cup: 2012–13

Hibernian
Scottish Cup: 2015–16
Scottish Championship: 2016–17

Cove Rangers
Scottish League Two: 2019–20

Individual 
Scottish Premier League Young Player of the Month: January 2010

References

External links 

1993 births
Living people
Footballers from Aberdeen
Scottish footballers
Scotland youth international footballers
Scotland under-21 international footballers
Association football midfielders
Aberdeen F.C. players
Wigan Athletic F.C. players
Yeovil Town F.C. players
Shrewsbury Town F.C. players
Hibernian F.C. players
Dundee United F.C. players
Scottish Premier League players
Premier League players
English Football League players
People educated at Hazlehead Academy
Scottish Professional Football League players
Cove Rangers F.C. players